Harlem Lullaby is an album by jazz pianist Junior Mance which was recorded in 1966 and released on the Atlantic label.

Reception

Allmusic awarded the album 3 stars with the review by Scott Yanow stating: "Most records by pianist Junior Mance are well worth getting, but this obscure Atlantic album was a bit of a misfire. One of the problems is that on three of the eight songs, Mance switches to harpsichord, which doesn't work too well".

Track listing
All compositions are by Junior Mance except where indicated.
 "The Uptown" - 3:52
 "That Mellow Feeling" - 4:35
 "Cootin'" - 4:43
 "I'm Falling For You" (Joe "Trafalgar" Hubert, George Sanders, Clarence Williams) (misidentified on album as 'Floyd Trill') - 5:03
 "St. James Infirmary" (Traditional) - 3:11
 "Harlem Lullaby" - 4:54
 "Run 'Em Round" - 4:37
 "What Becomes of the Brokenhearted" (William Weatherspoon, Paul Riser, James Dean) - 3:02

Personnel
Junior Mance - piano (tracks 2, 4 & 6-8), harpsichord (tracks 1, 3 & 5)
Bob Cunningham  (tracks 2 & 6), Gene Taylor (tracks 1, 3-5, 7 & 8) - bass
Alan Dawson (tracks 2 & 6), Ray Lucas (tracks 1, 3 & 8), Bobby Thomas (tracks 4, 5 & 7) - drums

References

 

1967 albums
Junior Mance albums
Atlantic Records albums
Albums produced by Joel Dorn